Tegeticula maculata is a moth of the family Prodoxidae. It is found in North America in central-southern cismontane California, in the Sierra Nevada north to Fresno County, in north-western Arizona, and from Baja California Norte to the Vizcaino region. The habitat consists of coastal chaparral and montane dry shrubby grassland.

Description
The wingspan is 16–23 mm for ssp. maculata. The forewings for this subspecies are white with two to twelve black spots. The hindwings are medium gray and lightly scaled. Subspecies extranea has a wingspan of 14–19 mm. The forewings are completely black, as are the hindwings, but these are more thinly scaled.

Ecology
The larvae feed exclusively on developing seeds of  Hesperoyucca whipplei. It is the sole pollinator of Hesperoyucca whipplei. Pupation takes place in a cocoon in the soil.

Subspecies
Tegeticula maculata maculata
Tegeticula maculata extranea (Edwards, 1888)

References

Moths described in 1881
Prodoxidae